A Chinese Ghost Story III is a 1991 Hong Kong romantic comedy-horror film directed by Ching Siu-tung and produced by Tsui Hark. It is the sequel to A Chinese Ghost Story and A Chinese Ghost Story II.

Though technically a distant sequel, the plot is more of a retelling of the original A Chinese Ghost Story. Joey Wong reprises her role as a ghostly beauty bound in servitude to the Tree Demon. The Tree Demon's seal, as cast by the monk Yin (Wu Ma) in the original film, only lasts for 100 years. Now 100 years later, the Tree Demon awakens.

Plot
The film starts with a flashback to the first film with Taoist Yin sealing away the tree demon, but tells the scholar Ning Tsai Shen that it will reawaken in 100 years.

Fast forward 100 years later, two Buddhist monks master Bai Yun and his inept disciple Shi Fang are transporting a golden idol of Buddha. On their travels they meet the relatively honorable mercenary Taoist Yin (It is revealed later that he was named after the Taoist swordsman Yin from the first movie and had even been rejected by him when he asked to be his student.) When talking to a merchant, Yin accidentally cuts the roof off Shi fang’s backpack revealing the golden Buddha statue. Beset by the thieves and ne'er-do-wells in the villages, the monks go to spend the night at the local temple, which is none other than the Orchid Temple of the first film. Unknown to the monks, they were followed by bandits from town. As the bandits make a move on them, one of them trips over a corpse arm and mistakes it for a ghost tripping him and they all run off scared since Lotus Temple was rumored to be haunted. As the bandits run off they hear female ghosts singing and mistake them to be living humans. The bandits then are captured by the tree demon and are all killed. While meditating, the monks hear the commotion and master Bai Yun goes to investigate telling Shi fang to stay in the temple. The tree demon knows of the residing monks and tell a female ghost Lotus to go and seduce Shi fang. Lotus tries to seduce him many times the first night, but after he finds out she is a ghost she attempts to kill him on orders from the tree demon but he saves himself by reciting mantras repelling her. Despite this, he lets Lotus go out of compassion before his master comes back. Over the next few nights, Shi Fang is visited by Lotus again and the two become fond of each other.

However, another ghost Butterfly becomes suspicious of her sister Lotus. Being rivals for the favor of the Tree Demon, Butterfly plots to capture the monk and expose her sister's betrayal. When the Tree Demon attempts to take Shi Fang, the master intervenes and uses his staff to transport his disciple to safety. In the ensuing battle with the Tree Demon, the master himself is captured.

Shi Fang enlists Yin to help rescue his master, and feels he must also help Lotus by recovering her urn. Yin and the master do battle with the Tree Demon using Taoist and Buddhist supernatural skills together, destroying it. Though he disapproves of his disciple's relationship with the ghost, the master helps to save Lotus as well. However, after the Tree Demon's destruction the Black Mountain Demon takes up the pursuit of Yin, Shi Fang, Master Bai Yun and Lotus. He summons high pillars to block their escape route and darkens the sky so the sunlight cannot shine on earth.

Master Bai Yun then casts a spell on Shi Fang and covers his body with his own blood, which has taken on a golden colour because of his accumulated spiritual energy. Lotus then takes Shi Fang up to the sky above the dark clouds so that Shi Fang can use his golden body to channel the power of the Buddha to break the demon's barrier of darkness so the sunlight can re-enter the earth. In the end, the Black Mountain Demon is killed by sunlight, and the sky clears. Shi Fang thinks Lotus may have been killed by the sunlight, and starts looking for her. He finds Lotus hiding under a pile of rocks, safe from the sun, and Lotus tells Shi Fang that her spirit will follow him when he takes her urn of ashes away from that place.

Cast
 Tony Leung Chiu-Wai as Monk Shi Fang
 Jacky Cheung as Swordsman Yin
 Joey Wong as Lotus
 Nina Li Chi as Butterfly
 Lau Siu-ming as Tree Devil (Lao Lao)
 Lau Shun as Shi Fang's Master/ Reverend Bai Yun
 Lau Yuk-ting as Jade
 Tommy Wong as Man with Yin in teahouse
 Sam Hoh as Rascal

References

External links
 
 

1991 films
1991 fantasy films
1991 romantic comedy films
1990s comedy horror films
Hong Kong romantic comedy films
Hong Kong horror films
A Chinese Ghost Story films
Hong Kong sequel films
Films directed by Ching Siu-tung
1990s Hong Kong films